Nils Engdahl (4 November 1898 – 10 September 1983) was a Swedish runner who competed at the 1920 and 1924 Summer Olympics in six 100–800 m events in total. He had his best achievements in the 4 × 400 m relay, in which his teams finished fifth and second in 1920 and 1924, respectively. Individually he won a bronze medal in the 400 m in 1920.

Together with his brother, Wilhelm "Wille" Engdahl, Nils Engdahl played football for IFK Stockholm before changing to athletics in 1917. From 1920 to 1935 he held Swedish records in the 200 m and from 1918 to 1934 in the 400 m. Between 1918 and 1927 he won four national titles in the 100 m, six in the 200 m, and six in the 400 m. He was the best Swedish runner over 100–400 m distances for three consecutive years. In addition he played bandy for Järva IS until 1937. He later married Olympic diver Signe Johansson.

References

1898 births
1983 deaths
People from Haninge Municipality
Swedish male sprinters
Olympic silver medalists for Sweden
Olympic bronze medalists for Sweden
Athletes (track and field) at the 1920 Summer Olympics
Athletes (track and field) at the 1924 Summer Olympics
Olympic athletes of Sweden
Medalists at the 1924 Summer Olympics
Medalists at the 1920 Summer Olympics
Olympic silver medalists in athletics (track and field)
Olympic bronze medalists in athletics (track and field)
Sportspeople from Stockholm County